Mónica Fernanda Macha (born 17 February 1972) is an Argentine politician, currently serving as National Deputy representing Buenos Aires Province. A member of New Encounter, Macha was elected in 2017 for the Unidad Ciudadana coalition, and currently sits in the Frente de Todos bloc. She previously served as a member of the Provincial Senate of Buenos Aires Province.

Early life and education
Macha was born on 17 February 1972 in Buenos Aires. She was raised in the barrio of Caballito. Macha studied psychology at the University of Buenos Aires, graduating in 2000, and has a master's degree on Epidemiology, Health Administration and Health Policies from the National University of Lanús.

She has lived in Castelar since 1992. She is married to Martín Sabbatella, former mayor of Morón Partido and founder of New Encounter. Macha and Sabbatella have one daughter.

Political career
In the 2013 legislative election, Macha ran for a seat in the Senate of Buenos Aires Province in the First Electoral Section, as part of the Front for Victory list. As senator, she presided the upper chamber's parliamentary commission on Human Rights.

Macha ran for a seat in the Argentine Chamber of Deputies in the 2017 legislative election; she was the seventh candidate in the Unidad Ciudadana list in Buenos Aires Province. The Unidad Ciudadana list received 36.28% of the votes, and Macha was elected. She was sworn in on 6 December 2017. She was a supporter of the 2020 Voluntary Interruption of Pregnancy bill, which legalized abortion in Argentina.

Ahead of the 2021 primary elections, she was confirmed as one of the Frente de Todos candidates for re-election in Buenos Aires Province.

Electoral history

References

External links

Profile on the official website of the Chamber of Deputies (in Spanish)

Living people
1972 births
Politicians from Buenos Aires
People from Morón Partido
Members of the Argentine Chamber of Deputies elected in Buenos Aires Province
Women members of the Argentine Chamber of Deputies
Members of the Buenos Aires Province Senate
21st-century Argentine politicians
21st-century Argentine women politicians